= Estil Fretwell =

American politician

Member of the Missouri House of Representatives from the 1st district
- In office January 3, 1979 – January 7, 1987
- Preceded by: Richard J. DeCoster
- Succeeded by: Stephen R. Waters

Personal details
- Born: September 1, 1952 (age 73)
- Party: Democratic

Estil Fretwell (born September 1, 1952) is an American politician who served in the Missouri House of Representatives from the 1st district from 1979 to 1987.
